The Philosophy of Friedrich Nietzsche is a book by H. L. Mencken, the first edition in 1908. The book covers both better and lesser known areas of Friedrich Nietzsche's life and philosophy. It is notable both for its suggestion of Mencken's still-developing literary talents at the age of 27 and for its impressive detail as the first book on Nietzsche written in English (only seven years after Nietzsche's death) considering the lack of reliable interpretations of Nietzsche in the Western sphere of letters at the time; Mencken prepared for writing this book by reading all of Nietzsche's published philosophy, including several works in the original German.

Literary reception
Following its publication, The Philosophy of Friedrich Nietzsche quickly became a popular resource to scholars and lay audiences alike, though this is likely due to the fact that few such publications existed in English at that time. Mencken personally translated The Antichrist for use in his compendium.

Despite the best available information at the time, some of the particulars of Nietzsche's life that Mencken described are now known to be false. Additionally, Mencken often – albeit unintentionally – permitted his personal biases (especially his own views on social Darwinism and, potentially, anti-semitism) to influence his interpretations of Nietzsche. Mencken, for instance, erroneously equated Nietzsche's "will to power" with Arthur Schopenhauer's "will to live", and at times omitted explanations of Nietzsche's philosophies due to his confusing writing style. Nevertheless, some of his analyses are still considered cogent, especially regarding Nietzsche's theory of drama and views on Christianity. Due to this broad and close style of examination, and enthusiasm for such, The Philosophy of Friedrich Nietzsche may very well be where "Nietzsche Studies" earnestly began in America.

References

External links

The Philosophy of Friedrich Nietzsche 1908 complete book from archive.org

1908 non-fiction books
American non-fiction books
Books about Friedrich Nietzsche
Books by H. L. Mencken
English-language books